Technopaganism is the merging of neopaganism and magical ritual with digital technologies. This may be through the use of technology merely as an aid, such as video conferencing for example, or it may be a worship of the technology itself. The internet for instance, may be seen by some as having spiritual significance. Techno-music may also be involved in technopaganism. Modern tribal and urban primitive movements such as cyberpunk, urban shamanism and rave culture are associated with electronic dance music.

Definition
Technopaganism deals with spiritual and magical facets of technology and technological society. Associated with this is the use of technological metaphors (most often computer or telecommunications metaphors) to describe spiritual phenomena, as well as the use of symbolism from popular culture in spiritual contexts.

This can include the substitution of technology for traditional magical tools, such as using their oven for a hearth, keeping a "Disk of Shadows" instead of a "Book of Shadows", and using a laser pointer as a wand. In other practice, technology is the target of the magical work, such as the use of stones and other charms to help improve the performance of mundane items or online role-playing avatars

Beliefs 
When used to describe belief systems, technopaganism focuses on the spiritual side of technology. This can include the belief that technological items and artifacts of modern living - such as buildings, roads, parks, cars, and other such items - have pseudo-spirits, or totem spirits, of their own. This also extends to cities.

One belief that faces substantial objections is that the Internet itself is attaining a unique spirit. Indeed, it is the stated objective of the creator of VRML to bring about the merging of the spiritual world with the physical world.

In popular culture
In the TV series Buffy the Vampire Slayer, the major character Jenny Calendar is a technopagan.

American Gods by Neil Gaiman marries traditional ideas of gods as a form of egregore with the results of progress and new technology on society leading to the creation of the "New Gods"

References

Further reading 
Erik Davis. TechGnosis : Myth, Magic & Mysticism in the Age of Information. Harmony, 1998. 
Mark Dery. "Deus Ex Machina: Technopaganism," in Escape Velocity: Cyberculture at the End of the Century. Grove/Atlantic, 1996. . 
Raven Kaldera and Tannin Schwartzstein. The Urban Primitive: Paganism in the Concrete Jungle. Llewellyn, 2002. 
Lisa Mc Sherry. The Virtual Pagan. Red Wheel Weiser, 2002. 
Christopher Penczak. City Magick: Urban rituals, spells and shamanism. Weiser, 2001. 
Steven Vedro. "Digital Dharma: Expanding Consciousness in the Infosphere". Quest, 2007. .

External links 
 ADF Technopagan SIG (Special Interest Group)

Modern pagan beliefs and practices
Cyberpunk culture
Modern paganism and technology